Gabriel Tiacoh (February 9, 1963 – April 2, 1992) was a sprinter from Côte d'Ivoire who specialised in the 400 metres. He is best known for winning his nation's first Olympic medal, in the 400 meters in 1984.

A former African record holder, he was the African champion over the distance in 1984 and 1989, as well as being the silver medallist in 1985 and 1988. He competed at the World Championships in Athletics in 1983 and 1987, finishing seventh in the 400 m final at the latter edition. He represented Côte d'Ivoire at the Olympics for a second time at the 1988 Seoul Games, but did not make the final.

He died of tuberculous meningitis in 1992 in Atlanta, Georgia at the age of 29, survived by his only daughter Alexis Tiacoh. He had a personal best of 44.30 seconds for the 400 m.

Career
He took part in the inaugural World Championships in Athletics, and was knocked out in the quarter-final stage of the men's 400 m. In 1984 he started by winning the 400 metres event at the African Championships in Athletics in Rabat. A few weeks later, at the Olympic Games, he managed to win the silver medal with 44.54 seconds, a new African record. At 20 years of age, Tiacoh had become the first Olympic medal winner from a West African country. He also ran in the 4×400 metres relay at the competition, but the men's team (including Georges Kablan Degnan, Avognan Nogboum and René Djédjémel Mélédjé) was knocked out in the semi-finals.

He lost his continental 400 m title to Innocent Egbunike at the 1985 African Championships in Athletics, although Tiacoh still managed to win a silver medal. The following year he improved his African 400 m record twice; first with a run of 44.32, then another of 44.30 seconds (which was the fastest by any athlete that season). He also managed to become the NCAA champion that year. Tiacoh ran at the 1987 World Championships in Athletics and easily progressed through the heats to the final. However, he only managed to finish in seventh place in the 400 m final as he could not match his previous form (his semi-final time of 44.69 s would have been enough to gain the bronze).

At the 1988 African Championships in Athletics, he was again beaten into second place by Egbunike. The Côte d'Ivoire team managed a silver medal in the relay event. Tiacoh represented his country at the Olympics for a second time, but he could not repeat his medal success and was eliminated in the quarter-finals after finishing in fifth place. He helped the Ivorian relay team to the Olympic semi-final, but they finished in sixth position and did not qualify for the final.

His final year of major competitions was 1989: he regained his 400 m African title at the 1989 African Championships in Athletics and also won a gold medal at the first Jeux de la Francophonie. Representing Africa at the 1989 IAAF World Cup, he finished third in the 400 m for the bronze medal.

Tiacoh died in 1992 in Atlanta of tuberculous meningitis caused by miliary tuberculosis at the age of 29. He remains the 400 m national record holder for Côte d'Ivoire.

He had an annual track and field meeting named in his honour – the Gabriel Tiacoh meet in Abidjan.

Achievements

Trivia
In the comedy sketch show Little Britain, Denver Mills (David Walliams) claims to have the silver medal won by Tiacoh at the 1984 Summer Olympics, however this is not mentioned in the show. (The comedy arises from the fact that people do not appreciate his achievement as much as he would like.)

References

1963 births
1992 deaths
Ivorian male sprinters
Athletes (track and field) at the 1984 Summer Olympics
Athletes (track and field) at the 1988 Summer Olympics
Deaths from meningitis
Olympic athletes of Ivory Coast
Olympic silver medalists for Ivory Coast
Neurological disease deaths in Georgia (U.S. state)
Infectious disease deaths in Georgia (U.S. state)
Tuberculosis deaths in Georgia (U.S. state)
Medalists at the 1984 Summer Olympics
Olympic silver medalists in athletics (track and field)
20th-century deaths from tuberculosis
Competitors at the 1986 Goodwill Games
Goodwill Games medalists in athletics